The 1940 NC State Wolfpack football team was an American football team that represented North Carolina State University as a member of the Southern Conference (SoCon) during the 1940 college football season. In its fourth season under head coach Williams Newton, the team compiled a 3–6 record (3–5 against SoCon opponents) and was outscored by a total of 161 to 120.

Schedule

References

NC State
NC State Wolfpack football seasons
NC State Wolfpack football